Sophronica undulata is a species of beetle in the family Cerambycidae. It was described by Stephan von Breuning in 1943. It is known from the Democratic Republic of the Congo, Angola, and Cameroon.

References

Sophronica
Beetles described in 1943